Events from the year 1812 in Canada.

Incumbents
Monarch: George III

Federal government
Parliament of Lower Canada: 7th 
Parliament of Upper Canada: 5th (until March 6) then 6th (starting July 27)

Governors
Governor of the Canadas: Robert Milnes
Governor of New Brunswick: George Prévost
Governor of Nova Scotia: John Wentworth then John Coape Sherbrooke
Commodore-Governor of Newfoundland: Charles Morice Pole
Governor of Prince Edward Island: Joseph Frederick Wallet DesBarres

Events
 June 18 – The U.S. declares war on Britain, beginning the War of 1812. There were about 4,000 British troops in Canada. George Prevost is Governor. Four Canadian battalions are assembled, and the Citadel at Quebec is guarded by the inhabitants.
 July 11 – Americans under General William Hull invade Canada from Detroit.
 August 16 – Isaac Brock with a force of 1,350, nearly half Aboriginals, takes Detroit. He paroles many of Hull's 2,000.
 August 20 – Launch of John Molson's second steamboat, the Swiftsure, at Montreal.
 August to October – The Red River Colony is begun in Canada's northwest on lands granted to Thomas Douglas by the Hudson's Bay Company.
 October – Almost half of Vermont's Legislators regard war as needless and impolitic; but Vermont imposes a penalty of $1,000 for every unauthorized communication with Canadians.
 October 13 – Stephen Van Rensselaer IV's command is repulsed, on Queenston Heights by Gen. Sheaffe and Governor Brock, who is killed. Of the 10,000 under Van Rensselaer, many were unwilling to invade, though willing to defend the United States.
 Fighting on the same side as British militia and Mohawk Indians, a group of black soldiers helps force American invaders to retreat in the Battle of Queenston Heights.
 October 25 – Battle at St. Regis.
 November 20 – Henry Dearborn's command cross the Lacolle. Charles de Salaberry eludes them, and, in the haze, U.S. troops fire upon each other.
 David Thompson retires to Montreal.
 The Americans gain several victories, on the water, as Napoleon engages the British attention.
 The United States calls out 175,000 men, Canada 2,000.
 For all purposes Canada votes 87,000 pounds.

Births
 May 12 – John Simpson, merchant, miller, banker, and politician (d.1885)
 October 21 – David H. Armstrong, United States Senator from Missouri from 1877 till 1879. (d. 1893)
 November 2 – William James Anderson, physician, amateur geologist and historian (d.1873)
 November 6 – Louis-Victor Sicotte, lawyer, judge and politician (d.1889) 
 December 12 – John Sandfield Macdonald, Premier of Ontario (d.1872)

Deaths
 January – Thomas Walker, advocate and politician  (b. c. 1759)
 January 12 – James Henry Craig, officer, colonial administrator (b.1748) 
 March 11 – John Burbidge, soldier, land owner, judge and political figure in Nova Scotia. (b.1718)
 October 13 – Sir Isaac Brock, military commander, administrator of Upper Canada (b.1769) 
 December 2- Pierre-Louis Panet, lawyer, notary, seigneur, office holder, politician, and judge (b.1761)

References 

 
12
1812 in North America